Reclaim The City  (RTC) is a non-racial social movement fighting for land and housing in Cape Town's inner-city and wealthy suburbs. Reclaim The City is known for its campaigns for affordable and low-income housing as well as spearheading the occupation of two empty and dilapidated government buildings which it turned into housing for poor and vulnerable families.

Tafelberg Campaign

Reclaim The City began first as a campaign against the state's sale of a piece of land in Sea Point called Tafelberg to be used for a private school. The movement and its supporters demanded that the land instead be used for affordable housing. With the help of the NGO Ndifuna Ukwazi, they took the Western Cape Provincial Government as well as the City of Cape Town to court to stop the sale. They were successful in the Cape High Court with the judgment setting aside the sale. According to reports, "The court declare[d] that the Province and City have failed in their constitutional duties to provide access to adequate housing and to land on an equitable basis. In doing so, they have 'failed to take adequate steps to redress spatial apartheid in central Cape Town.'" The judgment is currently being appealed to a higher court. RTC is now calling for government to respect the high court ruling and put in place a plan to build affordable housing on the site.

Occupations of Cissie Gool House and Ahmed Kathrada House

Reclaim The City along with evicted and houseless residents of the inner city in Cape Town occupied the old unused Woodstock Hospital in March 2017. They turned the property into a housing occupation for hundreds of families. The occupation has been likened to a modern-day commune in the image of the famous Paris Commune of 1871.

Also in March 2017, Reclaim The City spearheaded a second occupation, that of the former Helen Bowden Nurses Home in the wealthy suburb of Green Point in Cape Town. The property was turned into housing for a few hundred families.

Both occupations have been called a "tool to hold government to account" and have been referred to as "the only affordable housing opportunities for poor and working-class people in the metro".

References

External links 
Reclaim The City official Facebook Page
Attending an Advice Assembly run by Reclaim the City

Further reading

 Cirolia, L.R., Ngwenya, N., Christianson, B., and Scheba, S. (2018). Retrofitting, repurposing and re-placing: A multi-media exploration of occupation in Cape Town, South Africa. plaNext – next generation planning;
 Herold, B and DeBarros, M. (Dec 2020). “It’s not just an occupation, it’s our home!” The politics of everyday life in a long-term occupation in Cape Town and their effects on movement development. Interface: a journal for and about social movements: Volume 12 (2): 121 - 156
 Weber, M. (2018). The right to the City (Centre): a spatial development framework for affordable inner-city housing in Cape Town's Foreshore. University of Cape Town: City and Regional Planning: Masters Dissertation.

Affordable housing advocacy organizations
Civil disobedience
Cape Town
Homelessness organizations
Housing in South Africa
Land rights movements
Political organisations based in South Africa
Politics of South Africa
Social movements in South Africa
Squatters' movements